Jacques Desagneaux (born 1905) was a French film editor, active between 1930 and 1967. He was also an occasional actor, appearing in a handful of films.

Selected filmography
 My Friend Victor (1931)
 To the Polls, Citizens (1932)
 The Bread Peddler (1934)
 The Two Boys (1936)
 Fire in the Straw (1939)
 Berlingot and Company (1939)
 Notre-Dame de la Mouise (1941)
 Carmen (1942)
 La Symphonie fantastique (1942)
 Voyage Without Hope (1943)
 The Battle of the Rails (1946)
 A Lover's Return (1946)
 Man to Men (1948)
 All Roads Lead to Rome (1949)
 Lost Souvenirs (1950)
 Adorable Creatures (1952)
 Fanfan la Tulipe (1952)
 Lucrèce Borgia (1953)
 Daughters of Destiny (1954)
 Madame du Barry (1954)
 Nana (1955)
 Nathalie (1957)
 The Law Is the Law (1958)
 Dynamite Jack (1961)
 The Gentleman from Epsom (1962)
 The Black Tulip (1964)

References

Bibliography
 Mitchell, Charles P. The Great Composers Portrayed on Film, 1913 through 2002. McFarland, 2004.

External links

1905 births
Year of death unknown
French film editors
French male film actors
People from Vincennes